Molybdenum cofactor guanylyltransferase (MobA, MoCo guanylyltransferase) is an enzyme with systematic name GTP:molybdenum cofactor guanylyltransferase. This enzyme catalyses the following chemical reaction:

 GTP + molybdenum cofactor  diphosphate + guanylyl molybdenum cofactor

Catalyses the guanylation of the molybdenum cofactor.

References

External links 
 

EC 2.7.7